Pageant may refer to:

 Procession or ceremony in elaborate costume
 Beauty pageant, or beauty contest
 Latter Day Saint plays and pageants, run by the Church of Jesus Christ of Latter-day Saints or by members local to the area of the pageant
 Medieval pageant, a narrative medieval procession connected with a festival
 Nativity play, also known as a "Christmas pageant"
 Pageant (album), the second album by queer punk duo PWR BTTM
 Pageant (film), a documentary film that explores the dramas and realities of the Miss Gay America Contest
 Pageant (magazine), a 20th-century American monthly periodical
 Pageant (musical), a 1991 Off-Broadway musical by Robert Longbottom
 Pageant (novel), a 1933 novel by Australian author G. B. Lancaster
 "Pageant" (song), a 2004 single by Moi dix Mois
 pageant.exe, an authentication agent, a component of the PuTTY SSH
 Pageants (band), an American indie rock duo

See also
 Pageantry (disambiguation)